Brachychalcinus is a genus of characins found in tropical South America, with five currently described species:
 Brachychalcinus copei (Steindachner, 1882)
 Brachychalcinus nummus J. E. Böhlke, 1958
 Brachychalcinus orbicularis (Valenciennes, 1850) (discus tetra)
 Brachychalcinus parnaibae R. E. dos Reis, 1989
 Brachychalcinus reisi Garcia-Ayala, Ohara, Pastana & Benine, 2017
 Brachychalcinus retrospina Boulenger, 1892

References
 

Characidae
Fish of South America
Taxa named by George Albert Boulenger